Jussi Hauta-aho, better known as Kube also known as 2 Litran Juissi, is a Finnish rapper from Hakunila. He started rapping in 2003 and is signed with Monsp Records with whom he had his charting album Lentokonetila in 2013 followed by another album Flow in 2014. Kube is also part of the rap collective On The Street Entertainment, that also includes Jukka-Poika, Julma Henri & RPK, Stepa, Solonen, Sustain, Pelan, Ras Henry & Fin-Jam Reggae Band.

Discography

Other releases
2003: Cubenrapinat (2003)
2010: Kliffaa hei (EP)
2012: Kubenrapinat (mixtape)

Joint albums
2003: Pumppaa tätä (jointly with Vanha Lahna)
2004; Kuberkeikka (2004)
2005: Yli-ihmiset (jointly with Rokkaava hevonen)
2007: Sirkus (jointly with B-Mäkki)

References

Finnish rappers
Living people
Year of birth missing (living people)